The Five Days (Italian: Le cinque giornate; also known as The Five Days of Milan) is a 1973 comedy-drama film directed by Dario Argento.

Plot 
The film is set in Milan in full swing during the anti-Austrian revolt of 1848.
A petty criminal, Cainazzo (Adriano Celentano) and a baker, Romulus (Enzo Cerusico), are involuntarily involved in the movements of that period, the person finding the major contradictions of the time.
Assist – in the midst of idealists and patriots – an exemplary gallery of characters: aristocrats, opportunistic, bloodthirsty adventurers, traitors. Reluctantly, the two villains are overwhelmed by events.
But in the face of so much injustice and violence, Romulus responds, indicating instinctively what is the point of view of the people.

Release
The Five Days was released in Italy on 20 December 1973.

Principal cast

References

External links 
 
 

1973 films
Films directed by Dario Argento
Films set in 1848
Films set in Italy
1970s Italian-language films
Films set in Milan
Italian comedy-drama films
1973 comedy-drama films
Films with screenplays by Dario Argento
1970s Italian films